Belgium is a nation that has competed at six Hopman Cup tournaments and first competed in the 12th Hopman Cup in 2000. Belgium has been the runner-up on one occasion, in 2011, when they finished second in their group but after Serbia's withdrawal from the final due to an abdominal injury sustained by Ana Ivanovic, they were promoted to face USA in the final.

Players
This is a list of players who have played for Belgium in the Hopman Cup.

Results

1 Due to an ankle injury sustained by Kim Clijsters during her singles match, Belgium was forced to give Australia a walkover in the mixed doubles and were also unable to play their final tie of 2004.
2 Belgium actually finished second in their group in 2011 but were promoted to the final after group leaders, Serbia, were unable to compete.

References

Hopman Cup teams
Hopman Cup
Hopman Cup